Lucien Goldmann (20 July 1913 – 8 October 1970) was a French philosopher and sociologist of Jewish-Romanian origin. A professor at the EHESS in Paris, he was a Marxist theorist. His wife was sociologist Annie Goldmann.

Biography
Goldmann was born in Bucharest, Romania, but grew up in Botoşani. He studied law at the University of Bucharest and the University of Vienna under the Austromarxist jurist Max Adler. In 1934, he went to the University of Paris to study political economy, literature, and philosophy. He moved to Switzerland in November 1942, where he was placed in a refugee camp until 1943.

Through Jean Piaget's intervention, he was subsequently given a scholarship to the University of Zurich, where he completed his PhD in philosophy in 1945 with a thesis entitled Mensch, Gemeinschaft und Welt in der Philosophie Immanuel Kants (Man, Community and World in the Philosophy of Immanuel Kant).

In 1968, Goldmann was a visiting professor at Columbia University.

Philosophy
While many Parisian leftists staunchly upheld Marxism's "scientificity" in the 1950s and 1960s, Lucien Goldmann insisted that Marxism was by then in severe crisis and had to reinvent itself radically if it were to survive. He rejected the traditional Marxist view of the proletariat and contested the structural Marxist movement. In fact, the popularity of such trends on the Left Bank was one reason why Goldmann's own name and work were eclipsed — this despite the acclaim of thinkers as diverse as Jean Piaget and Alasdair MacIntyre, who called him "the finest and most intelligent Marxist of the age."

He refused to portray his aspirations for humanity's future as an inexorable unfolding of history's laws, but saw them rather as a wager akin to Blaise Pascal's in the existence of God. "Risk", Goldmann wrote in his classic study of Pascal's Pensées and Jean Racine's Phèdre, "is possibility of failure, hope of success, and the synthesis of the three in a faith which is a wager are the essential constituent elements of the human condition". He called his work "dialectical" and "humanist". He sought to synthesize the genetic epistemology of Piaget with the Marxism of György Lukács.

Goldmann founded the theory of genetic structuralism in the 1960s. He was a humanist socialist, a disciple of Lukács, and was best known for his sociology of literature. In later life he became an important critic of structuralism.

Selected bibliography

In German
Mensch, Gemeinschaft und Welt in der Philosophie Immanuel Kants (University of Zurich, 1945). Doctoral thesis.

In French
Le dieu caché ; étude sur la vision tragique dans les Pensées de Pascal et dans le théâtre de Racine. Paris: Gallimard, 1955.
Recherches dialectiques. Paris: Gallimard, 1959.
Pour une sociologie du roman. Paris: Gallimard, 1964.
Sciences humaines et philosophie. Suivi de structuralisme génétique et création littéraire. Paris: Gonthier, 1966.
Structures mentales et création culturelle. Paris: 10/18, 1970.
Epistémologie et philosophie. Paris: Denoël, 1970.
Lukacs et Heidegger. Paris: Denoël-Gonthier, 1973.

English translations
The Hidden God: a study of tragic vision in the Pensees of Pascal and the tragedies of Racine. Trans. Philip Thody. London: Routledge, 1964.
Immanuel Kant. Translated from the French and German by Robert Black. (London: New Left Books, 1971; Verso, 2011).
 
The Human Sciences and Philosophy. London: Jonathan Cape, 1973.
The Philosophy of Enlightenment. Trans. Henry Maas. London: Routledge, 1973.
Towards a Sociology of the Novel. 1964. Trans. Alan Sheridan. New York: Tavistock Publications, 1975.
 "The Epistemology of Sociology". Telos 18 (Winter 1976-77). New York: Telos Press
Cultural Creation in Modern Society Introduction by William Maryl and Translated by Bart Grahl (New York: Telos Press, 1976). 
Essays on Method in the Sociology of Literature Translated and edited by William Q. Boelhower (New York: Telos Press, 1979).
 "Genet's The Balcony: A Realist Play." Trans. Robert Sayre. Praxis: A Journal of Radical Perspectives on the Arts 4 (1978): 123-131. Trans. of "Une Pièce réaliste: Le Balcon de Genet" in Les Temps Modernes 171 (June 1960).
Lukacs and Heidegger: Towards a New Philosophy. Trans. William Q. Boelhower. London: Routledge, 2009.

Reviews
Womack, Peter (1982), Benjamin, Eagleton and Goldmann, which includes a review of Essays on Method in the Sociology of Literature, in Murray, Glen (ed.). Cencrastus No. 8, Spring 1982, pp.47 & 48, .

Notes and references

Further reading
Cohen, Mitchell: The Wager of Lucien Goldmann: Tragedy, Dialectics, and a Hidden God, Princeton University Press, 1994

French Marxists
Romanian emigrants to France
Jewish philosophers
Jewish socialists
Marxist theorists
Marxist humanists
People from Botoșani
Romanian Jews
1913 births
1970 deaths
French male writers
20th-century French philosophers
Columbia University faculty